Lists of mathematics topics cover a variety of topics related to mathematics. Some of these lists link to hundreds of articles; some link only to a few. The template to the right includes links to alphabetical lists of all mathematical articles. This article brings together the same content organized in a manner better suited for browsing.
Lists cover aspects of basic and advanced mathematics, methodology, mathematical statements, integrals, general concepts, mathematical objects, and reference tables.
They also cover equations named after people, societies, mathematicians, journals, and meta-lists.

The purpose of this list is not similar to that of the Mathematics Subject Classification formulated by the American Mathematical Society. Many mathematics journals ask authors of research papers and expository articles to list subject codes from the Mathematics Subject Classification in their papers. The subject codes so listed are used by the two major reviewing databases, Mathematical Reviews and Zentralblatt MATH. This list has some items that would not fit in such a classification, such as list of exponential topics and list of factorial and binomial topics, which may surprise the reader with the diversity of their coverage.

Basic mathematics

This branch is typically taught in secondary education or in the first year of university.
 Outline of arithmetic
 Outline of discrete mathematics
 List of calculus topics
 List of geometry topics
 Outline of geometry
 List of trigonometry topics
 Outline of trigonometry
 List of trigonometric identities
 List of logarithmic identities
 List of integrals of logarithmic functions
 List of set identities and relations
 List of topics in logic

Areas of advanced mathematics

As a rough guide, this list is divided into pure and applied sections although in reality, these branches are overlapping and intertwined.

Pure mathematics

Algebra
Algebra includes the study of algebraic structures, which are sets and operations defined on these sets satisfying certain axioms. The field of algebra is further divided according to which structure is studied; for instance, group theory concerns an algebraic structure called group.
 Outline of algebra
 Glossary of field theory
 Glossary of group theory
 Glossary of linear algebra
 Glossary of ring theory
 List of abstract algebra topics
 List of algebraic structures
 List of Boolean algebra topics
 List of category theory topics
 List of cohomology theories
 List of commutative algebra topics
 List of homological algebra topics
 List of group theory topics
 List of representation theory topics
 List of linear algebra topics
 List of reciprocity laws

Calculus and analysis

Calculus studies the computation of limits, derivatives, and integrals of functions of real numbers, and in particular studies instantaneous rates of change. Analysis evolved from calculus.
 Glossary of tensor theory
 List of complex analysis topics
 List of functional analysis topics
 List of vector spaces in mathematics
 List of integration and measure theory topics
 List of harmonic analysis topics
 List of Fourier analysis topics
 List of mathematical series
 List of multivariable calculus topics
 List of q-analogs
 List of real analysis topics
 List of variational topics
 See also Dynamical systems and differential equations section below.

Geometry and topology

Geometry is initially the study of spatial figures like circles and cubes, though it has been generalized considerably. Topology developed from geometry; it looks at those properties that do not change even when the figures are deformed by stretching and bending, like dimension.
 Glossary of differential geometry and topology
 Glossary of general topology
 Glossary of Riemannian and metric geometry
 Glossary of scheme theory
 List of algebraic geometry topics
 List of algebraic surfaces
 List of algebraic topology topics
 List of cohomology theories
 List of circle topics
 List of topics related to pi
 List of curves topics
 List of differential geometry topics
 List of general topology topics
 List of geometric shapes
 List of geometric topology topics
 List of geometry topics
 List of knot theory topics
 List of Lie group topics
 List of mathematical properties of points
 List of topology topics
 List of topologies
 Topological property
 List of triangle topics

Combinatorics
Combinatorics concerns the study of discrete (and usually finite) objects. Aspects include "counting" the objects satisfying certain criteria (enumerative combinatorics), deciding when the criteria can be met, and constructing and analyzing objects meeting the criteria (as in combinatorial designs and matroid theory), finding "largest", "smallest", or "optimal" objects (extremal combinatorics and combinatorial optimization), and finding algebraic structures these objects may have (algebraic combinatorics).
 Outline of combinatorics
 Glossary of graph theory
 List of graph theory topics

Logic

Logic is the foundation that underlies mathematical logic and the rest of mathematics. It tries to formalize valid reasoning. In particular, it attempts to define what constitutes a proof.
 List of Boolean algebra topics
 List of first-order theories
 List of large cardinal properties
 List of mathematical logic topics
 List of set theory topics
 Glossary of order theory

Number theory
The branch of mathematics deals with the properties and relationships of numbers, especially positive integers.
Number theory is a branch of pure mathematics devoted primarily to the study of the integers and integer-valued functions. German mathematician Carl Friedrich Gauss said, "Mathematics is the queen of the sciences—and number theory is the queen of mathematics."
Number theory also studies the natural, or whole, numbers. One of the central concepts in number theory is that of the prime number, and there are many questions about primes that appear simple but whose resolution continues to elude mathematicians.
 List of algebraic number theory topics
 List of number theory topics
 List of recreational number theory topics
 Glossary of arithmetic and Diophantine geometry
 List of prime numbers—not just a table, but a list of various kinds of prime numbers (each with an accompanying table)
 List of zeta functions

Applied mathematics

Dynamical systems and differential equations

A differential equation is an equation involving an unknown function and its derivatives.

In a dynamical system, a fixed rule describes the time dependence of a point in a geometrical space. The mathematical models used to describe the swinging of a clock pendulum, the flow of water in a pipe, or the number of fish each spring in a lake are examples of dynamical systems.
 List of dynamical systems and differential equations topics
 List of nonlinear partial differential equations
 List of partial differential equation topics

Mathematical physics
Mathematical physics is concerned with "the application of mathematics to problems in physics and the development of mathematical methods suitable for such applications and for the formulation of physical theories".
 List of mathematical topics in classical mechanics
 List of mathematical topics in quantum theory
 List of mathematical topics in relativity
 List of string theory topics
 Index of wave articles

Theory of computation

The fields of mathematics and computing intersect both in computer science, the study of algorithms and data structures, and in scientific computing, the study of algorithmic methods for solving problems in mathematics, science, and engineering.
 List of algorithm general topics
 List of computability and complexity topics
 Lists for computational topics in geometry and graphics
 List of combinatorial computational geometry topics
 List of computer graphics and descriptive geometry topics
 List of numerical computational geometry topics
 List of computer vision topics
 List of formal language and literal string topics
 List of numerical analysis topics
 List of terms relating to algorithms and data structures

Information theory and signal processing
Information theory is a branch of applied mathematics and Social science involving the quantification of information. Historically, information theory was developed to find fundamental limits on compressing and reliably communicating data.

Signal processing is the analysis, interpretation, and manipulation of signals. Signals of interest include sound, images, biological signals such as ECG, radar signals, and many others. Processing of such signals includes filtering, storage and reconstruction, separation of information from noise, compression, and feature extraction.
 List of algebraic coding theory topics
 List of information theory topics
 List of cryptography topics

Probability and statistics

Probability theory is the formalization and study of the mathematics of uncertain events or knowledge. The related field of mathematical statistics develops statistical theory with mathematics. Statistics, the science concerned with collecting and analyzing data, is an autonomous discipline (and not a subdiscipline of applied mathematics).
 Catalog of articles in probability theory
 List of probability topics
 List of stochastic processes topics
 List of probability distributions
 List of statistics topics
 Outline of regression analysis

Game theory
Game theory is a branch of mathematics that uses models to study interactions with formalized incentive structures ("games"). It has applications in a variety of fields, including economics, anthropology , political science, social psychology and military strategy.
 Glossary of game theory
 List of games in game theory

Operations research
Operations research is the study and use of mathematical models, statistics, and algorithms to aid in decision-making, typically with the goal of improving or optimizing the performance of real-world systems.
 List of knapsack problems
 List of network theory topics

Methodology
 List of graphical methods
 List of mathematics-based methods
 List of rules of inference

Mathematical statements
A mathematical statement amounts to a proposition or assertion of some mathematical fact, formula, or construction. Such statements include axioms and the theorems that may be proved from them, conjectures that may be unproven or even unprovable, and also algorithms for computing the answers to questions that can be expressed mathematically.
 List of algorithms
 List of axioms
 List of conjectures
 List of conjectures by Paul Erdős
 Combinatorial principles
 List of equations
 List of formulae involving pi
 List of representations of e
 List of inequalities
 List of lemmas
 List of mathematical identities
 List of mathematical proofs
 List of theorems

General concepts
 List of convexity topics
 List of dualities
 List of exceptional set concepts
 List of exponential topics
 List of factorial and binomial topics
 List of fractal topics
 List of logarithm topics
 List of mathematical properties of points
 List of numeral system topics
 List of order topics
 List of partition topics
 List of permutation topics
 List of polynomial topics
 List of properties of sets of reals
 List of transforms

Mathematical objects
Among mathematical objects are numbers, functions, sets, a great variety of things called "spaces" of one kind or another, algebraic structures such as rings, groups, or fields, and many other things.
 List of mathematical examples
 List of algebraic surfaces
 List of curves
 List of complex reflection groups
 List of complexity classes
 List of examples in general topology
 List of finite simple groups
 List of Fourier-related transforms
 List of manifolds
 List of mathematical constants
 List of mathematical functions
 List of mathematical knots and links
 List of mathematical shapes
 List of mathematical spaces
 List of matrices
 List of numbers
 List of polygons, polyhedra and polytopes
 List of regular polytopes
 List of simple Lie groups
 List of small groups
 List of special functions and eponyms
 List of surfaces
 Table of Lie groups

Equations named after people
 Scientific equations named after people

About mathematics
 List of letters used in mathematics and science
 List of mathematical societies
 List of mathematics competitions
 List of mathematics history topics
 List of publications in mathematics
 List of mathematics journals

Mathematicians

Mathematicians study and research in all the different areas of mathematics. The publication of new discoveries in mathematics continues at an immense rate in hundreds of scientific journals, many of them devoted to mathematics and many devoted to subjects to which mathematics is applied (such as theoretical computer science and theoretical physics).
 List of game theorists
 List of geometers
 List of logicians
 List of mathematicians
 List of mathematical probabilists
 List of statisticians

Work of particular mathematicians

 List of things named after Niels Henrik Abel
 List of things named after George Airy
 List of things named after Jean d'Alembert
 List of things named after Archimedes
 List of things named after Vladimir Arnold
 List of things named after Emil Artin
 List of things named after Stefan Banach
 List of things named after Thomas Bayes
 List of things named after members of the Bernoulli family
 List of things named after Jakob Bernoulli
 List of things named after Friedrich Bessel
 List of things named after Élie Cartan
 List of things named after Augustin-Louis Cauchy
 List of things named after Arthur Cayley
 List of things named after Pafnuty Chebyshev
 List of things named after John Horton Conway
 List of things named after Richard Dedekind
 List of things named after Pierre Deligne
 List of things named after Peter Gustav Lejeune Dirichlet
 List of things named after Albert Einstein
 List of things named after Euclid
 List of things named after Leonhard Euler
 List of things named after Paul Erdős
 List of things named after Pierre de Fermat
 List of things named after Fibonacci
 List of things named after Joseph Fourier
 List of things named after Erik Fredholm
 List of things named after Ferdinand Georg Frobenius
 List of things named after Carl Friedrich Gauss
 List of things named after Évariste Galois
 List of things named after Hermann Grassmann
 List of things named after Alexander Grothendieck
 List of things named after Jacques Hadamard
 List of things named after William Rowan Hamilton
 List of things named after Erich Hecke
 List of things named after Eduard Heine
 List of things named after Charles Hermite
 List of things named after David Hilbert
 List of things named after W. V. D. Hodge
 List of things named after Carl Gustav Jacob Jacobi
 List of things named after Johannes Kepler
 List of things named after Felix Klein
 List of things named after Joseph-Louis Lagrange
 List of things named after Johann Lambert
 List of things named after Pierre-Simon Laplace
 List of things named after Adrien-Marie Legendre
 List of things named after Gottfried Leibniz
 List of things named after Sophus Lie
 List of things named after Joseph Liouville
 List of things named after Andrey Markov
 List of things named after John Milnor
 List of things named after Hermann Minkowski
 List of things named after John von Neumann
 List of things named after Isaac Newton
 List of things named after Emmy Noether
 List of things named after Henri Poincaré
 List of things named after Siméon Denis Poisson
 List of things named after Pythagoras
 List of things named after Srinivasa Ramanujan
 List of things named after Bernhard Riemann
 List of things named after Issai Schur
 List of things named after Anatoliy Skorokhod
 List of things named after George Gabriel Stokes
 List of things named after Jean-Pierre Serre
 List of things named after James Joseph Sylvester
 List of things named after Alfred Tarski
 List of things named after Alan Turing
 List of things named after Stanislaw Ulam
 List of things named after Karl Weierstrass
 List of things named after André Weil
 List of things named after Hermann Weyl
 List of things named after Norbert Wiener
 List of things named after Ernst Witt

Reference tables
 List of mathematical reference tables
 List of moments of inertia
 Table of derivatives

Integrals
In calculus, the integral of a function is a generalization of area, mass, volume, sum, and total. The following pages list the integrals of many different functions.
 Lists of integrals
 List of integrals of exponential functions
 List of integrals of hyperbolic functions
 List of integrals of inverse hyperbolic functions
 List of integrals of inverse trigonometric functions
 List of integrals of irrational functions
 List of integrals of logarithmic functions
 List of integrals of rational functions
 List of integrals of trigonometric functions

Journals
List of mathematics journals
List of mathematics education journals
:Category:History of science journals
:Category:Philosophy of science literature

Meta-lists
 Glossary of mathematical symbols
 List of important publications in mathematics
 List of important publications in statistics
 List of mathematical theories
 List of mathematics categories
 List of mathematical symbols by subject
 Table of logic symbols
 Table of mathematical symbols

See also
 Areas of mathematics
 Glossary of areas of mathematics
 Outline of mathematics
 Timeline of women in mathematics

Others
 Lists of unsolved problems in mathematics
 List of order theory topics
 List of topics related to π

Notes
 :  Definition from the Journal of Mathematical Physics .

External links and references
 2000 Mathematics Subject Classification from the American Mathematical Society, scheme authors find many mathematics research journals asking them to use to classify their submissions; those published then include these classifications.
 The Mathematical Atlas
 Maths Formula

Outlines of mathematics and logic
Wikipedia outlines
Lists of topics